The 2014–15 Scottish Junior Cup was the 129th season of the Scottish Junior Cup, the national knockout tournament for member clubs of the Scottish Junior Football Association. The competition was partnered by the charity Dyslexia Scotland and is known as The Dyslexia Scotland Junior Cup. The winner of this competition entered the following season's Scottish Cup at the first round stage.

A total of 161 clubs entered the competition, one more than the previous season. Dropping out were Coupar Angus, Fochabers and Steelend Victoria, who were in abeyance. New members Aberdeen University, Grantown and Spey Valley made their debut in the competition while Lossiemouth United returned to the tournament after a period of abeyance.

The seven Junior clubs qualified for this season's Scottish Cup, were not included in the draw for the first round. These were the four reigning league and cup champions:
 Auchinleck Talbot - West of Scotland Super League Premier Division
 Bo'ness United - East Superleague
 Culter - North Superleague
 Hurlford United - Junior Cup holders

Also qualified automatically are Banks O'Dee and Linlithgow Rose who achieved national club licensing requirements and Girvan who qualified automatically as historic full members of the Scottish Football Association.

Calendar
The provisional dates for each round of the 2014–15 tournament were as follows:

Drawn matches are replayed the following weekend. Replays ending in a draw proceed direct to penalty shootout. Semi-finals are played home and away over two legs, subject to decision by the SJFA management committee.

First round
The first round draw took place in the Pollok F.C. pavilion, Glasgow on 26 August 2014.

1 Match played at Johnstone Burgh F.C.2 Match played at Falkirk F.C.

Replays

Second round
The second round draw took place in the Irvine Meadow Social Club, Irvine on 5 October 2014.

3 Match played at Stoneyburn F.C.4 Tie switched to Banchory St. Ternan F.C.5 Tie switched to Deveronside F.C.6 Match played at Camelon Juniors F.C..

Replays

Third round
The third round draw took place in the offices of the Scottish Sun newspaper, Glasgow on 4 November 2014 at 12:30pm.

7 Match played at Longside F.C.8 Match played at Montrose F.C.

Replays

Fourth round
The fourth round draw took place in the offices of the Evening Times newspaper, Glasgow on 2 December 2014.

9 Tie switched to Penicuik Athletic F.C.10 Match played at Banks O' Dee F.C.

Replays

Fifth round
The fifth round draw took place on Peter and Roughie's Football Show on STV Glasgow on 4 February 2015.

Replays

Quarter-finals
The draw for the quarter-finals took place at Hampden Park, Glasgow on 27 February 2015.

Semi-finals
The draw for the Semi Final of the Dyslexia Scottish Junior Cup took place at Mar Hall Bishopton on Friday 27 March 2015 and was carried out by Steven Naismith of Everton.

First leg

Second leg

Final
The Final of the Dyslexia Scotland Junior Cup was played at Rugby Park, Kilmarnock on Sunday 7 June 2015 with a 4.05pm kick off. The game was televised live by BBC ALBA.

References

4
Scottish Junior Cup seasons